Kaleena is a given name. Notable people with the name include:

Kaleena Kiff (born 1974), American actress, producer, and director
Kaleena Mosqueda-Lewis (born 1993), American basketball player
Kalenna Harper (born 1982), American singer-songwriter, television personality, and record producer